John Roderick McKechnie KC (born 1 November 1950) is the Commissioner of the Corruption and Crime Commission of Western Australia. He is a former Justice of the Supreme Court of Western Australia, the highest ranking court in the Australian State of Western Australia, and formerly served as the State's first Director of Public Prosecutions.

He attended Scotch College from 1963 until 1967, then graduated in law from the University of Western Australia in 1972. He then took articles with Jackson McDonald & Co, before joining the Crown Law Department. He became a Queen's Counsel in 1989, and then in December 1991 was appointed by the Government of Western Australia as the state's first Director of Public Prosecutions. During his eight-year term in this role, the department processed on average 2,500 prosecutions per year.

On 2 March 1999, he was sworn in as a justice of the Supreme Court of Western Australia.

He retired from the Supreme Court on 22 April 2015 to take up an appointment as the Commissioner of the Corruption and Crime Commission.

Corruption and Crime Commissioner
On 28 April 2015, McKechnie was first appointed as the Commissioner of the Corruption and Crime Commission for a five-year term. During his tenure, the Corruption and Crime Commission found that a State Parliamentarian had misused an electoral allowance. McKechnie was involved in controversy following the expiration of his term as Commissioner on 25 April 2020, when his reappointment to the position was blocked by a bipartisan Parliamentary joint standing committee. In June 2021, the Western Australian Parliament passed legislation reappointing McKechnie as Commissioner without requiring the agreement of the joint standing committee, to take effect on 28 June 2021.

References

Further reading

See also
 Judiciary of Australia

Australian King's Counsel
1950 births
Living people
Judges of the Supreme Court of Western Australia